This is a list of manuscripts produced in Ireland as well as other manuscripts of Irish interest, including both vellum and paper manuscripts.

See also
Cín Dromma Snechtai
Irish Manuscripts Commission

Notes

Sources
General:

Brussels:

Dublin

 
Cambridge

External links
 ISOS, Irish Script on Screen
 CELT, Corpus of Electronic Texts
 MsOmit, Manuscript Sources to Old and Middle Irish Tales, 2017
 IMMURGU, Insular Medieval Manuscripts Reproduction Guide
 CODECS, Collaborative Online Database and e-Resources for Celtic Studies
 Proposal by WB Yeats in the Irish Senate in April 1923, concerning the local translation of Irish manuscripts.

 
Manuscripts
Literature lists